The Lebanese Elite Cup 2008 was the 11th edition of this football tournament in Lebanon. It was held from August 27 to September 11, 2008 in Beirut and Sidon. This tournament includes the five best teams from the 2007-08 Saison and the Cup Winner. Since Al-Mabarrah finished 4th in the league and won the cup, Shabab Al-Sahel qualified to the tournament too.

League Champions Al Ahed won the tournament after beating Al-Ansar 3–1 in the final, it was the first win for Al Ahed in this tournament. Al Ahed players Salih Sadir and Hassan Maatouk were the top scorers of the Lebanese Elite Cup, scoring three goals each.

It was the first edition after a 3-year break caused by the political protests and the 2006 Lebanon War. The draw took place on July 2, 2008 in Beirut.

Teams

Group stage

Group A

Group B

Knok-out stage

Semi finals

Final

Top Scorer

Lebanese Elite Cup seasons
Elite